Travis Scott (born 1991) is an American hip hop recording artist and producer.

Travis Scott may also refer to:
 Travis Scott (ice hockey) (born 1975), Canadian ice hockey player
 Travis Scott (American football) (born 1979), American football player
 Travis Scott (The Sims character), pre-made character from The Sims 4

See also
 Scott Travis (born 1961), American rock musician